Bad Luck Mountain is a mountain located in Adirondack Mountains of New York located in the Town of Indian Lake east-northeast of Indian Lake.

References

Mountains of Hamilton County, New York
Mountains of New York (state)